Jan van Steffeswert or alternatively Jan van Steffenswert or Jan van Stevensweert (c. 1460 – c. 1531) was an Early Netherlandish sculptor and wood carver based in Maastricht. Contrary to the customs of the time, he signed at least some of the works he produced, using variously Jan Bieldesnider, Jan van Weerd or Jan van Steffeswert. To date, fourteen works have been positively identified as his.

Works
Seated unidentified bishop – Bonnefantenmuseum, Maastricht, Netherlands.
Saint Catherine of Alexandria – British Museum, London, England
Iohannes in disco (head of Saint John the Baptist) – Curtius Museum, Liège, Belgium
Marianum (German: Strahlenkranzmadonna) – Aachen Cathedral, Germany
Saint Mary – Sint-Martinuskerk in Beek, Netherlands
Saint Barbara – Sint-Martinuskerk, Born, Netherlands
Saint Cecilia – St Matthiaskerk, Maastricht, Netherlands
Saint Crispinianus – Church of Sint-Pieter beneden, Villapark (Maastricht), Netherlands
Saint Hubertus – originally in the parish church of Erpekom, Peer, Belgium, now displayed in open air museum Bokrijk, Belgium
Saint Joseph – Sint-Nicolaaskerk, Heythuysen, Netherlands
The Virgin and Child with St. Anne – Bonnefantenmuseum, Maastricht, Netherlands.

Gallery

Notes and references

Bibliography 
 P. te Poel, Jan Van Steffeswert, Snoeck-Ducaji & Zoon, February 2001

External links 
  H.G.M. Rutten, Jan van Steffeswert, een maastrichtse beeldhouwer ?

Early Netherlandish sculptors
Artists from Maastricht
Netherlandish Gothic art